The 1951 Wimbledon Championships took place on the outdoor grass courts at the All England Lawn Tennis and Croquet Club in Wimbledon, London, United Kingdom. The tournament was held from Monday 25 June until Saturday 7 July 1951. It was the 65th staging of the Wimbledon Championships, and the third Grand Slam tennis event of 1951. Dick Savitt and Doris Hart won the singles titles; Hart also won both the women's doubles and mixed doubles, completing the triple crown.

This was the final Wimbledon tournament during the reign of King George VI.

Finals

Men's singles

 Dick Savitt defeated  Ken McGregor, 6–4, 6–4, 6–4

Women's singles

 Doris Hart defeated  Shirley Fry, 6–1, 6–0

Men's doubles

 Ken McGregor /  Frank Sedgman defeated  Jaroslav Drobný /  Eric Sturgess, 3–6, 6–2, 6–3, 3–6, 6–3

Women's doubles

 Shirley Fry /  Doris Hart defeated  Louise Brough /  Margaret duPont, 6–3, 13–11

Mixed doubles

 Frank Sedgman /  Doris Hart defeated  Mervyn Rose /  Nancye Bolton, 7–5, 6–2

Juniors

Boys' singles

 Johann Kupferburger defeated  Kamel Moubarek, 8–6, 6–4

Girls' singles

 Lorna Cornell defeated  Silvana Lazzarino, 6–3, 6–4

References

External links
 Official Wimbledon Championships website

 
Wimbledon Championships
Wimbledon Championships
Wimbledon Championships
Wimbledon Championships